Nadine Wilson Njeim is a Lebanese beauty queen who was elected Miss Lebanon 2007. She represented her country in Miss World 2007 in China and Miss Universe 2007 in Mexico.

Post-pageant career 
After passing on her title as Miss Lebanon, Njeim pursued a career in acting, and cast in various lead roles for TV series such as Ghazlel Baneit. Njeim also managed to land the voice-acting role of the Arabic-language voice of Lara Croft in the 2013 video game Tomb Raider. In 2018, she took the Arabic-language voice-acting role of Shadow of the Tomb Raider.

References

External links
  Nadine Njeim Official Website

1988 births
Living people
Miss World 2007 delegates
Lebanese beauty pageant winners
Miss Universe 2007 contestants
Lebanese television actresses
Lebanese American University alumni
Lebanese Christians